The 1947 National Challenge Cup was the 33rd edition of the United States Soccer Football Association's annual open cup. Today, the tournament is known as the Lamar Hunt U.S. Open Cup. Teams from the American Soccer League II competed in the tournament, based on qualification methods in their base region. Ponta Delgada S.C. won the tournament for their first time ever, by defeating Chicago Sparta.

External links 
 1947 National Challenge Cup results – TheCup.us

Lamar Hunt U.S. Open Cup
U.S. Open Cup